The .338-06 is a  cartridge based on the .30-06. It allows heavier .338 caliber bullets to be used from the .30-06 non-belted case. This can be a suitable choice for heavy bodied game such as moose, elk, and brown bear. The number and variety of .338 caliber bullets increased after the introduction in the late 1950s of the .338 Winchester Magnum cartridge, frequently chambered in the Winchester Model 70 rifle. More recently the introduction of the .338 Lapua magnum has caused an increase in interest in the .338 caliber and their projectiles. The .338-06 maintains much of the benefits of the .338 Winchester Magnum cartridge but has substantially less recoil, makes more efficient use of powder, and allows use of widely available .30-06 commercial and military cases. It is similar in concept to the .333 OKH as well as the .35 Whelen, which also use the .30-06 brass case as a basis for the cartridge. Thanks to the large number of rifles based on the .30-06 family of cartridges, having a .338-06 made usually only requires a simple barrel change by a competent gun smith. A-Square adopted the caliber as the .338-06 A-Square in approximately 1998, and was approved by SAAMI as a standardized caliber. Weatherby offered factory rifles and ammunition, but has now dropped the rifles from its inventory. The .338-06 A-Square tends to have a velocity advantage over the .35 Whelen and uses bullets that retain velocity and resist wind drift better than similar weight bullets fired from the .35 Whelen.

Practical Use
The .338-06 is a versatile cartridge for hunting bigger game. Loaded with light weight bullets, such as the 180gr. Nosler Accubond, it is adequate for species like deer or pronghorn at medium to long range, and when loaded with heavier premium bullets like the 225gr. Nosler Partition or even the 250gr partition the .338-06 can handle the largest North America game including moose and brown bear.

Rifles chambered in .338-06 need not be as heavy as a .338 Winchester Magnum or other .338 magnums; therefore, .338-06 chambered rifles are desirable for mountain hunting or where excessive weight is an issue. While the .338-06 performs well from a 22" barrel most magnum rifle cartridges in the same caliber, such as the .340 Weatherby, require a longer 24-26" barrel to reach their full potential.

See also
 List of rifle cartridges
 8 mm caliber Other cartridges in the same diameter range.
 .30-06 Springfield wildcat cartridges

References

 .338-06 at Quarterbore.com
 .338-06 reloading data from Reloaders Nest

Bibliography

External links
Jagen Weltweit, .338-06 by Norbert Klups 
Bullet drop at 100 to 400 yards

Pistol and rifle cartridges
Wildcat cartridges